I Prem U is a 2023 Indian Marathi-language romantic film written and directed by Niteen Gokul Kaher in his Marathi debut. Produced by Saishri Entertainment. It stars Abhijeet Amkar, Kayadu Lohar (debut in Marathi cinema), Sanjay Mone  in lead roles. It was theatrically released on 17 March 2023.

Cast 

 Abhijit Amkar as Sakha
 Kayadu Lohar as Veena
 Sanjay Mone
 Pratibha Bhagat
 Aanand Sarjerao Wagh
 Rushikesh Wanburkar
 Samadhan Murtdak
 Saishri Gursal

Release 
The film is slated to be released on 17 March 2023.

Soundtrack

Music is Composed by Sanju-Sangram duo 
(Sangram S Patil, Sanjay Arora) and Yashodhan Kadam.
Background Score is Composed by Sangram S Patil.
Vocals were provided by Sanju-Sangram, Ajay Gogavale , Shaan , Palak Muchhal, Vijay Yesudas,Soumee Sailsh,Pallavi Pargaonkar while lyrics by Darshan Bobade, Yashodhan kadam,Sanju-Sangram

References

External links 

 

2020s Marathi-language films
Indian romance films